Axidares or Ashkhadar also known as Exedares or Exedates (flourished second half of the 1st century & first half of the 2nd century, died 113) was a Parthian Prince who served as a Roman Client King of Armenia.

Axidares was one of the three sons born to the King Pacorus II of Parthia by an unnamed mother. Through his father he was a member of the House of Parthia thus a relation of the Arsacid dynasty of Armenia. Little is known of his life prior to becoming Armenian King.

Axidares succeeded his relative Sanatruces (Sanatruk) as Armenian King when he died in 110. He was put on the Armenian throne by his paternal uncle, the King Osroes I of Parthia without Roman consultation. Axidares was King of Armenia from 110 until 113.

Although the Romans supported Axidares' Kingship over Armenia, Trajan viewed the action by his uncle as an invitation to war with Parthia. Osroes I considered Axidares as incapable of governing. To avoid to going to war with the Roman emperor Trajan and keep peace with him, Osroes I deposed Axidares from his Armenian throne and replaced him with his other brother Parthamasiris for the Armenian Kingship.

References

Sources
 D.T. Potts, Araby the Blest: Studies in Arabian Archaeology, Museum Tusculanum Press, 1988 
 Yarshater, The Cambridge History of Iran, Volume 3, Cambridge University Press, 1993
 M. Bunson, A Dictionary of the Roman Empire, Oxford University Press, 1995
 T. Mommsen, W. Purdie Dickson & F. Haverfield, The provinces of the Roman Empire: from Caesar to Domitian, Gorgias Press LLC, 2004 
 K. Farrokh, Shadows in the Desert: Ancient Persia at War, Osprey Publishing, 2007 

2nd-century kings of Armenia
Arsacid kings of Armenia
Roman client kings of Armenia
2nd-century Iranian people